Scott Powers is an American physiologist, focusing on investigating the effects of muscular exercise and inactivity on both cardiac and skeletal muscle currently the UAA Endowed Professor at University of Florida.

References

1950 births
Living people
University of Florida faculty
American physiologists
Louisiana State University alumni
University of California, Berkeley alumni
University of Tennessee alumni
University of Georgia alumni